R. S. Shivaji (born 26 October 1956) is an Indian actor, who is known for his work in Tamil films. He has often collaborated in films involving Kamal Haasan and Raaj Kamal Films International, working as an assistant director, sound designer and line producer on film projects.

Career
R. S. Shivaji is the son of actor and producer M.R. Santhanam, who worked on films including Ellis R. Dungan's Meera (1945). His brother Santhana Bharathi is also a popular actor and film director, who has worked in Tamil cinema (Kollywood).

As an actor, R.S.Shivaji has primarily played comedy roles and regularly featured in Kamal Haasan's films in the 1980s and 1990s. His Saar! Neenga Engeyo Poiteenga, sir dialogue from Apoorva Sagodharargal (1989) directed at Janagaraj has been regularly parodied in later Tamil movies. He played important roles in Kolamavu Kokila and Dharala Prabhu as Nayanthara's father and Vivek's assistant, respectively.

Notable filmography

Panneer Pushpangal  (1981)
Madhu Malar  (1981)
Vasantham Varum  (1981)
Vadivangal (1981)
Meendum Oru Kaathal Kathai  (1983)
Vikram (1986)
Sathya (1988)
Jeeva (1988)
Apoorva Sagodharargal (1989)
Mappillai (1989)
Jagadeka Veerudu Athiloka Sundari (1990; Telugu)
Michael Madana Kama Rajan (1990)
Mounam Sammadham (1990)
My Dear Marthandan (1990)
Kavalukku Kettikaran (1991)
Thambikku Oru Pattu (1991)
Guna (1991)
Ele, My Friend  (1992; English) 
Kalaignan (1993)
Athma (1993)
Udan Pirappu (1993)
Magalir Mattum (1994)
Vietnam Colony (1994)
Pavithra (1994)
Chinna Vathiyar (1995)
Poove Unakkaga (1996)
Gopura Deepam (1997)
Thaali Pudhusu (1997)
Chachi 420 (1997)
Kutty (2001)
Little John (2001)
Pammal K. Sambandam (2002)
En Mana Vaanil (2002)
Villain (2002)
Anbe Sivam (2003)
Kurumbu (2003)
Aaytha Ezhuthu (2004)
M. Kumaran Son of Mahalakshmi (2004)
White Rainbow  (2005; Hindi)
Paramasivan (2006)
Kusthi (2006)
Jayam Kondaan (2008)
Unnaipol Oruvan (2009)
Kanden Kadhalai (2009)
Thambikku Indha Ooru  (2010) 
Maanja Velu  (2010) 
Maalai Pozhudhin Mayakathilaey (2012)
Sonna Puriyathu (2013)
Sutta Kadhai (2013)
Naveena Saraswathi Sabatham (2013)
Kalyana Samayal Saadham (2013)
Urumeen (2015)
Jil Jung Juk (2016)
Kanithan (2016)
Ennul Aayiram (2016)
Meen Kuzhambum Mann Paanaiyum (2016)
8 Thottakkal (2017)
Vanamagan (2017)
Sangili Bungili Kadhava Thorae  (2017) 
Kolamavu Kokila (2018)
Puppy (2019)
God Father (2020)
Dharala Prabhu (2020)
Soorarai Pottru (2020)
Maara (2021)
Parris Jeyaraj (2021)
Vanakkam Da Mappilei (2021)
Thalli Pogathey (2021)
Payanigal Gavanikkavum (2022)
Gargi (2022) 
Vattakara (2022)

Voice artist

Television
Kula Vilakku 
Ethanai Konam Ethanai Paarvai
Anbulla Snehidhiye
Maruthani
Vallamai Tharayo

Web series

References

External links

Tamil male actors
Male actors in Tamil cinema
Indian Tamil people
Male actors from Tamil Nadu
Living people
20th-century Indian male actors
Indian male film actors
Indian male comedians
Tamil comedians
1956 births